Topolnoye is a rural locality (a selo) and the administrative center of Topolinsky Selsoviet, Uglovsky District, Altai Krai, Russia. The population was 833 as of 2013. It was founded in 1849. There are 4 streets.

Geography 
Topolnoye is located 71 km south of Uglovskoye (the district's administrative centre) by road. Topolinsky Leskhoz is the nearest rural locality.

References 

Rural localities in Uglovsky District, Altai Krai